Nancy is an unincorporated community eight miles west of the city of Somerset in Pulaski County, Kentucky.  The ZIP Code for Nancy is 42544.

On January 19, 1862, during the American Civil War, Union forces achieved their first significant victory, defeating the Confederates at the Battle of Mill Springs near Nancy.
The Mill Springs National Cemetery today is administered by the United States Department of Veterans Affairs.

Nancy has a lending library, a branch of the Pulaski County Public Library.

References

Unincorporated communities in Pulaski County, Kentucky
Unincorporated communities in Kentucky